A consumer electronics store, in the United States and some other countries, is a physical store that sells consumer electronics. As technology has progressed, the United States has known variations such as phonograph dealers, radio stores, hi-fi stores, stereo stores, and audio video stores.

History
The origins of the consumer electronics store can be traced back to phonograph dealers in 1893, including specialized phonograph stores, as well as music stores which carried a wider array of music-related merchandise.

With the advent of radio, with radio receiving equipment being sold by specialist electric hardware shops, there was controversy as to whether radio equipment manufactures should sell wholesale to phonograph and music stores, and to department stores, but in 1923 Federal Telephone & Telegraph Co. started doing so and other manufacturers started suit. Wireless Age estimated that there were 15,000 phonograph dealers in the U.S. in that year.

In the mid-1950s, hi-fi stereo equipment hit the mainstream market and references began to "hi-fi stores". As demand grew for sets of audio components such as tuners, phonographs, receivers and speakers, many regional specialty audio/video chains were established and grew through the 1980s. Boston's Tweeter grew and eventually purchased chains in other regions, such as Bryn Mawr Stereo (Philadelphia), Hi-Fi Buys (Atlanta) Showcase Home Entertainment and Dow (San Diego). These chains added value versus other retailers of audio video equipment such as department stores, discount stores and appliance stores, by providing highly trained salespeople, a wide, often high-end selection of merchandise, and facilities where customers could experience the sound and video of the components

By the 1980s and 1990s, the U.S. was covered by pan-regional and national chains of big box retailers, such as the defunct Circuit City and The Good Guys and the extant Best Buy, where audio and video was a major line of merchandise, next to home appliances, cellphones and computers, putting pressure on independent dealers.

As by the 2010s, technology provided the vast majority of consumers with a high quality audio and video experience via their smartphone and cheap flatscreen televisions, a mass consumer market in the U.S. for larger audio and video components — other than televisions and smaller items — has vanished. Best Buy and a few regional chains remain in business. The independent dealers that remain cater to an ever more sophisticated niche of those looking for the highest quality audio and video reproduction.

Gallery

References

Retailers by type of merchandise sold

Consumer electronics